MS Piłsudski (later renamed ORP Piłsudski) was a medium-size ocean liner of the Polish Merchant Marine, named for Marshal Józef Piłsudski, a national hero of Poland.

History
She was built in Italy by the CRDA yard at Monfalcone, yard number 1126, for Polskie Transatlantyckie Towarzystwo Okrętowe ("Polish Transatlantic Shipping Company Limited" or PTTO), which in 1934 became Gdynia – Ameryka Linie Zeglugowe (Gdynia – America Line), with part of the payment being shipments of coal from Poland.

She entered the regular service as a liner on the trans-atlantic route in September 1935, setting sail for a maiden voyage from Gdynia to New York. As a liner, she was very badly damaged by her first ocean storm. In 1939, she was taken over for war service and scheduled to be converted into an armed merchant cruiser. The plans of that conversion were dropped, the ship being instead converted into a troop transport ship. During her first wartime voyage on 26 November 1939 sailing out of Newcastle, she struck a mine (most likely) or was torpedoed (lack of confirmation in German sources). Abandoned too soon by her crew, quite capable of being saved, she sank off the Humber.
 
She was the older sister ship to Poland's most famous ocean liner, the MS Batory. The Pilsudski's first skipper was Master Mariner Mamert Stankiewicz.

The liner found posthumously its place in the history of Polish literature. In the novel Eccentrics, written by Mr. W. Kowalewski and published by Marginesy-Publishers in 2015, the main character of the novel - a Polish swingman and dancer born in Lemberg, Fabian Apanowicz, takes part in the last peacetime voyage of the Pilsudski as a member of the ship's band, and after his return to Poland after the war, he tells the story of the unfinished voyage to his six years younger sister Wanda, a dentist in Ciechocinek (cf. W. Kowalewski, Excentrycy/Eccentrics, Marginesy Warsaw 2015, pp. 36–43).

See also
Polish navy

External links
History of M/S Pilsudski and M/S Batory
Official report of the sinking  
Diver report
The MS Piłsudski - "The Polish Titanic" What Happened with the pride of the Polish Navy?
 Cruising Ships, W.H. Mitchell and L. A Sawyer, Doubleday, 1967
 Wielka Ksiega Statkow Polskich, vol 2, J. Micinski, M. Twardowski, B. Huras.

References

Passenger ships of Poland
Ocean liners
Wreck diving sites in the United Kingdom
Ships built in Monfalcone
Ships built by Cantieri Riuniti dell'Adriatico
1934 ships
Ships of the Gdynia-America Line
Shipwrecks in the North Sea